Imanta is a Latvian feminine given name of Livonian origin. The associated name day is August 19.

References 

Latvian feminine given names
Feminine given names